Veliyam is a village in Kerala, India. It is situated near Kottarakara in the Kollam district of Kerala.

References

Villages in Kollam district